In quantum computing, and more specifically in superconducting quantum computing, a transmon is a type of superconducting charge qubit that was designed to have reduced sensitivity to charge noise. The transmon was developed by Robert J. Schoelkopf, Michel Devoret, Steven M. Girvin, and their colleagues at Yale University in 2007. Its name is an abbreviation of the term transmission line shunted plasma oscillation qubit; one which consists of a Cooper-pair box "where the two superconductors are also capacitatively shunted in order to decrease the sensitivity to charge noise, while maintaining a sufficient anharmonicity for selective qubit control".

The transmon achieves its reduced sensitivity to charge noise by significantly increasing the ratio of the Josephson energy to the charging energy. This is accomplished through the use of a large shunting capacitor. The result is energy level spacings that are approximately independent of offset charge. Planar on-chip transmon qubits have T1 coherence times approximately 30 μs to 40 μs. Recent work has shown significantly improved T1 times as long as 95 μs by replacing the superconducting transmission line cavity with a three-dimensional superconducting cavity, and by replacing niobium with tantalum in the transmon device, T1 is further improved up to 0.3 ms. These results demonstrate that previous T1 times were not limited by Josephson junction losses. Understanding the fundamental limits on the coherence time in superconducting qubits such as the transmon is an active area of research.

Comparison to Cooper-pair box 

The transmon design is similar to the first design of the charge qubit known as a "Cooper-pair box"; both are described by the same Hamiltonian, with the only difference being the  ratio. Transmons typically have  (while  for typical Cooper-pair-box qubits), which is achieved by shunting the Josephson junction with an additional large capacitor. 

Reduced anharmonicity complicates the device operation as a two level system, e.g. exciting the device from the ground state to the first excited state by a resonant pulse also populates the higher excited state. This complication is overcome by complex microwave pulse design, that takes into account the higher energy levels, and prohibits their excitation by destructive interference. The significant gain in the coherence time outweigh the decrease in the anharmonicity for controlling the states with high fidelity.

Measurement, control and coupling of transmons is performed by means of microwave resonators with techniques from circuit quantum electrodynamics also applicable to other superconducting qubits. Coupling to the resonators is done by placing a capacitor between the qubit and the resonator, at a point where the resonator electromagnetic field is greatest. For example, in IBM Quantum Experience devices, the resonators are implemented with "quarter wave" coplanar waveguides with maximal field at the signal-ground short at the waveguide end; thus every IBM transmon qubit has a long resonator "tail". The initial proposal included similar transmission line resonators coupled to every transmon, becoming a part of the name. However, charge qubits operated at a similar  regime, coupled to different kinds of microwave cavities are referred to as transmons as well.

See also 
 Charge qubit
 Anharmonicity
 Circuit quantum electrodynamics (cQED)
 Dilution refrigerator
 List of quantum processors
 Quantum harmonic oscillator
 Superconducting quantum computing

References 

Quantum information science
Quantum electronics
Superconductivity